Caryl Whittier Chessman (May 27, 1921 – May 2, 1960) was a convicted robber, kidnapper and serial rapist who was sentenced to death for a series of crimes committed in January 1948 in the Los Angeles area. Chessman was charged with 17 counts and convicted under a loosely interpreted "Little Lindbergh law" – later repealed, but not retroactively – that defined kidnapping as a capital offense under certain circumstances. His case attracted worldwide attention, and helped propel the movement to end the use of capital punishment in the state of California.

While in prison, Chessman was considered vexatious, with one judge writing in 1957, "[Chessman is] playing a game with the courts, stalling for time while the facts of the case grow cold." Chessman wrote four books, including his 1954 memoir Cell 2455, Death Row. The book was adapted for the screen in 1955 and stars William Campbell as a character modelled after Chessman.

He was executed in California's gas chamber in 1960.

Early years
Chessman was born Carol Whittier Chessman ( was, at the time, a popular name for boys of Danish descent; Chessman himself later changed the spelling to ) in St.Joseph, Michigan, the only child of Serl Whittier and Hallie Lillian (née Cottle) Chessman, both devout Baptists. In 1922, the family relocated to Glendale, California. Chessman's father became despondent after failing at each of a series of jobs, and attempted suicide twice. In 1929 Chessman's mother was paralyzed in a car accident. As a child, Chessman had asthma, which left him weak, and he also contracted encephalitis, which he later claimed changed his personality. After recovering he began to rebel against his parents' strict Baptist upbringing by committing petty crimes. The family was hit hard by the Depression, and Chessman later recalled that he stole food and other items as an adolescent to help his parents.

In July 1937 Chessman was caught stealing a car and sent to Preston School of Industry (also known as Preston Castle), a reform school in Northern California. He was released in April 1938, only to return a month later after stealing another car. In October 1939 Chessman was sent to the Los Angeles County Road Camp after yet another car theft. It was there that he met a group of young criminals known as the "Boy Bandit Gang." After his release from the road camp he joined the gang and, in April 1941, was arrested in connection with a number of gang-related robberies and shootouts with police. As the gang's leader, Chessman was convicted of robbery and sent to San Quentin State Prison, then transferred to the California Institution for Men in Chino. He escaped in October 1943 but was arrested a month later. Convicted on another robbery charge, Chessman was sentenced to five years to life and served the minimum, mostly at Folsom State Prison. He was released in December 1947 and returned to Glendale.

Crimes and conviction
In the first three weeks of January 1948, a number of robberies and thefts were reported throughout the Greater Los Angeles Area. On January 3, two men robbed a haberdashery in Pasadena with a .45 caliber semi-automatic pistol. On January 13, a 1946 Ford coupe was stolen from a Pasadena street. On January 18, a man driving a car described as a 1947 Ford coupe used a red light to stop a vehicle near Malibu Beach, then used a .45 caliber pistol to rob the vehicle's occupants. Later that day a second couple were robbed in the same manner near the Rose Bowl. Police quickly began to suspect a common perpetrator, and Los Angeles newspapers dubbed the suspect "The Red Light Bandit." On January 19, a third couple were robbed as they sat parked on a hill in West Pasadena, and the woman, Regina Johnson, was forced to perform oral sex on her assailant. On January 22, a fourth couple returning home from a church dance was pulled over on Mulholland Drive. The assailant dragged the girl, 17-year-old Mary Alice Meza, a short distance to his vehicle. Her boyfriend then drove away and was pursued by the assailant. After an unsuccessful attempt to force the male victim off the road, the perpetrator drove Meza to a secluded area where he forced her to engage in oral and anal sex, threatening to kill her boyfriend if she did not comply.

The following day, police in North Hollywood attempted to stop a 1946 Ford coupe matching the description given by Meza and her boyfriend, and also by witnesses to a robbery at a clothing store in Redondo Beach earlier that day. After a high-speed chase the vehicle's occupants, Chessman and David Knowles, were captured and arrested. After a 72-hour interrogation, during which Chessman later claimed he was beaten and tortured, Chessman confessed to the "Red Light Bandit" crimes. He was also positively identified by the rape victims, Johnson and Meza. In late January 1948 Chessman was indicted on 18 counts of robbery, kidnapping, and rape. After a three-week trial in May, he was convicted on 17 of the 18 counts, and was sentenced to death. The prosecution was led by district attorney J. Miller Leavy. Chessman's accomplice, Knowles, was tried and convicted as an accessory in the store robberies, but his conviction was reversed on appeal in 1950 due to an absence of direct incriminating evidence and "impermissible abuse of the law."

Appeals and controversy

Part of the controversy surrounding the Chessman case stemmed from the state's unusual application of the death penalty. At the time, under California's version of the "Little Lindbergh Law," a crime that involved kidnapping with bodily harm could be considered a capital offense. Two of the counts against Chessman alleged that he dragged Johnson 22 feet from her car before demanding oral sex, and that he abducted Meza against her will, driving her a considerable distance before raping her. The court ruled that both actions fit the law's definition of kidnapping with bodily harm, thus making Chessman subject to the death penalty under the law. The law was repealed by the time his trial began but was in effect at the time of the crimes; the repeal was not applied retroactively.

Chessman asserted his innocence from the outset, arguing throughout the trial and the appeals process that he was alternately the victim of mistaken identity, or of a conspiracy to frame him; he also claimed to know the identity of the real perpetrator, but refused to reveal it. He further alleged that the confession he signed during his initial police interrogation was coerced through force and intimidation.

Over the course of nearly twelve years on death row Chessman filed dozens of appeals, acting as his own attorney, and successfully avoided eight execution deadlines, often by a few hours. Most appeals were based on assertions that he was forced to go to trial unprepared; that the trial itself was unfair; that confessions obtained by force and intimidation and promises of partial immunity were used in evidence against him; that California's "Little Lindbergh Law" was unconstitutional; and that the transcript of record forwarded upon appeal to the state supreme court was incomplete, and important parts of the proceedings were missing or incorrectly recorded. In 1957 the U.S. Supreme Court ordered the State of California to conduct a full review of the transcripts. The review concluded that the transcripts were substantially accurate.

Chessman also took his case to the public through letters, essays and books. His four books—Cell 2455, Death Row; Trial by Ordeal; The Face of Justice; and The Kid Was a Killer—became bestsellers. He sold the rights to Cell 2455, Death Row to Columbia Pictures, which made a 1955 film of the same name, directed by Fred F. Sears, with William Campbell as Chessman. Chessman's middle name, Whittier, was used as the surname of his alter ego protagonist in the film. The manuscript of his fourth book, The Kid Was a Killer, was seized by San Quentin warden Harley O. Teets in 1954 as a product of “prison labor." It was eventually returned to Chessman in late 1957, and published in 1960.

Chessman's books and public campaign ignited a worldwide movement to spare his life, while focusing attention on the larger question of the death penalty in the United States, at a time when most Western countries had abandoned it, or were in the process of doing so. The office of California Governor Pat Brown was flooded with appeals for clemency from noted authors and intellectuals from around the world, including Aldous Huxley, Ray Bradbury, Norman Mailer, Dwight Macdonald, and Robert Frost, and from such other public figures as former First Lady Eleanor Roosevelt and Christian evangelist Billy Graham.

The Chessman affair put Brown, an opponent of the death penalty, in a difficult position. He was unable to grant Chessman executive clemency as the California Constitution required the commutation of a two-time felon's death sentence to be ratified by the California Supreme Court, which declined ratification by a vote of 4–3. After a long period of inaction Brown finally issued a 60-day stay a few hours before the February 19, 1960, scheduled execution. He issued the stay, he said, out of concern that the execution could threaten the safety of President Dwight D. Eisenhower during an official visit to South America, where the Chessman case had inflamed anti-American sentiment. Pat Brown's son and future Governor Edmund G. "Jerry" Brown unsuccessfully lobbied his father to spare Chessman.

Execution
Brown's stay of execution, along with Chessman's last appeals, ran out in April 1960, and Chessman finally went to the gas chamber at San Quentin Prison on May 2, twenty-five days before his 39th birthday. According to some sources, a last-minute attempt by a California Supreme Court justice to impose a new stay pending a habeas corpus motion failed when a court secretary misdialed the prison's phone number; by the time the call was routed to the execution chamber, the execution had begun and could not be halted. During the execution Chessman vigorously nodded his head, a pre‑arranged signal to reporters that he was experiencing pain. Chessman's body was cremated, as per his wishes, at the Mount Tamalpais Mortuary and Cemetery in San Rafael, California. He requested that his ashes be interred with his parents' at Forest Lawn Memorial Park in Glendale, but Forest Lawn refused the request on "moral grounds." His ashes were buried at the Mount Tamalpais Cemetery, then disinterred in 1974 by Chessman's attorney Rosalie Asher and scattered off the coast of Santa Cruz Island.

Chessman was dubbed "the first modern American executed for a non-lethal kidnapping." His time on death row – eleven years and ten months – was then the longest ever in the United States, a record that was broken in the post-Furman v. Georgia era on March 15, 1988, when Willie Darden Jr. was executed in Florida's electric chair for a 1973 murder. Several months after Chessman's execution, Billy Wesley Monk was executed on November 21, 1960, for kidnapping two women, attempting to rape the first and raping the second, and was the last to be executed for a non-lethal kidnapping in the United States. Further executions for non-lethal offenses, including robbery and rape, occurred as late as 1964, but have not been carried out since the 1960s. Such convictions were also considerably focused on the Southern states, whereas the executions of Chessman, Monk and Rudolph Wright, gassed in 1962 for an assault (with deadly outcome, although without mens rea) possibly faced greater scrutiny for occurring in California.

In popular culture
Megan Terry’s play, The People vs Ranchman, loosely based on Chessman’s crimes and punishment, was produced Off-Broadway in New York during the 1968–1969 season.

Author Dominique Lapierre visited Chessman several times during his incarceration. Lapierre was then a young reporter working for a French newspaper. His account of Chessman appears in the book A Thousand Suns.

Artist Bruce Conner created his sculpture Child in 1959–60 as an homage to Chessman.

The radio version of Dragnet referenced the Chessman case and the Redlight Bandit in a 1949 episode. The producers changed the storyline of his crimes, allowing the rape victim to die in the fictitious version, justifying the death penalty.

Chessman's execution is referenced in Lucio Fulci's 1969 giallo One on Top of the Other, in which the character of George Dumurrier (Jean Sorel) is prepared to be executed in San Quentin's gas chamber. Not only were these sequences shot on location in San Quentin, but several of the prison personnel who were responsible for Chessman's death acted in them; a fact that was especially highlighted in the film's trailer.

Chessman is mentioned in Neil Diamond's 1970 song "Done Too Soon and in French singer Nicolas Peyrac's song "So far away from LA".

Chessman's execution in the gas chamber is mentioned in Richard Brautigan's 1967 novella Trout Fishing in America.

In 1977, Alan Alda starred in an NBC television movie about Chessman's life, Kill Me If You Can. This was sometimes shown, subsequently, as The Caryl Chessman Story.

The song "The Ballad of Caryl Chessman," written by the songwriting team of Al Hoffman and Dick Manning, includes the chorus "let him live, let him live, let him live". It was a minor hit single for Ronnie Hawkins two months before Chessman's execution.

Country music star Merle Haggard stated in an interview in 1995 that many years earlier, when he was a prison inmate, observing Chessman's preparations for his execution helped to set him on the straight and narrow.

Chessman, a 2016 play by Joe Rodota, tells the story of the execution from the viewpoint of Governor Pat Brown.

The song "Broadway Melody of 1974" by the rock group Genesis, off their album The Lamb Lies Down on Broadway, contains the lyrics: "The cheerleader waves her cyanide wand with the smell of peach blossoms and bitter almond." (Gas chamber reference) then: "Caryl Chessman sniffs the air and leads the parade, he knows, in a scent, you can bottle all you made." "Sniffs the air" likely refers to the execution method; also the singer Gabriel pronounces "in a scent" indistinguishable from "innocent".

Mexican professional luchador, "Chessman, the red light killer," from AAA, is named after Chessman.

A fictionalized version of Chessman appears in James Ellroy's 2021 novel Widespread Panic.

Chessman is believed by the fictional serial killer Thomas Bishop to be his biological father in the 1979 novel, By Reason of Insanity by Shane Stevens.

References

External links

 Chessman-Asher Collection, 1921-1996 housed at the California State Library.
 Caryl Chessman online
 Newsreel footage about Caryl Chessman 
 An in depth article on Chessman
 FBI files on Chessman
 
 
 
 

1921 births
1960 deaths
20th-century executions by California
20th-century executions of American people
American male criminals
American male novelists
20th-century American memoirists
American people convicted of attempted rape
American people convicted of kidnapping
American rapists
Executed people from Michigan
People executed by California by gas chamber
People executed for kidnapping
People from St. Joseph, Michigan
San Quentin State Prison inmates
Novelists from Michigan
20th-century American novelists
20th-century American male writers
American male non-fiction writers
American convicts who became writers